The canoeing competitions at the 2018 Mediterranean Games took place on 23 and 24 June at the Canal Olímpic de Catalunya in Castelldefels.

Athletes competed in 5 sprint kayak events.

Medal summary

Men's events

Women's events

Medal table

References

External links
2018 Mediterranean Games – Canoeing

 
Sports at the 2018 Mediterranean Games
2018
Mediterranean Games